Zemplínska šírava (sometimes called the "Slovak sea". is a dam and lake in eastern Slovakia, near the town of Michalovce, wholly belonging to the Michalovce District. The name recalls the historical Zemplín region. Water from the dam flows into the Laborec river, which in turn flows into the Bodrog river. The area is primarily used for recreation. It also supplies cooling water for the Vojany Power Station.

Panorama

External links

Zemplinska sirava  

Dams in Slovakia
Reservoirs in Slovakia
Geography of Košice Region
Tourist attractions in Košice Region